Craiova International Airport  is located in the south-western part of Romania,  east of Craiova municipality, one of Romania's largest cities. The airport area is the headquarters of Avioane Craiova (formerly known as IRAv Craiova), the company which built the Romanian IAR-93 and IAR-99 aircraft.

History
A new terminal was opened at Craiova airport in December 2010. Runway renovation works took place in summer 2015. Since July 2014, Craiova Airport is the base for Wizz Air which serves 7 destinations in 4 countries. In March 2018, Ryanair announced it would terminate all services at Craiova by October 2018 which had operated since November 2016 and consisted of a single route to Valencia.

Airlines and destinations
The following airlines operate regular scheduled and charter flights at Craiova Airport:

Statistics

Ground transportation
The airport is connected to the city via bus route 9 (Metro-Central Market-Craiovița Nouă) of the public transport company RAT Craiova. There is a station in front of the airport with all-day service time.

See also
Aviation in Romania
Transport in Romania

References

External links
 Official website
 Google Map – Aerial View
 

1957 establishments in Romania
Airports established in 1957
Airports in Romania
Airport
Buildings and structures in Dolj County